The Hurricane Ridge Ski and Snowboard Area is a small ski area in the northwest United States, located on the Olympic Peninsula of Washington.

Hurricane Ridge is one of only three lift-serviced ski areas operating in a U.S. National Park (Badger Pass in Yosemite National Park, and Boston Mills/Brandywine Ski Resort in Cuyahoga Valley National Park are the others). It is the westernmost ski area in the continental United States.

During months when snow is present, the 17-mile road leading to Hurricane Ridge is prone to avalanches due to high speed wind conditions. Park rangers may close the road leading to the snow park for a whole day.

External links
 
 Ski Map.org – trail maps – Hurricane Ridge

Ski areas and resorts in Washington (state)
Buildings and structures in Clallam County, Washington
Olympic National Park
Tourist attractions in Clallam County, Washington